UCC is a football and hurling club associated with University College Cork. UCC teams play in the Cork Senior Football Championship and Cork Senior Hurling Championship as well as the two main third-level competitions namely the Sigerson Cup in football, the Fitzgibbon Cup in hurling and the Ashbourne Cup in camogie.  They also compete against inter-county sides in the pre-season McGrath Cup (football) and Waterford Crystal Cup (hurling). The piratical skull and crossbones logo on the team shirt, which first appeared on the rugby team of what was then known as Queen’s College Cork (composed mostly of medical students, hence the bones) was appropriated in the mid-1910s by the GAA clubs, and in 1929 by the UCC hockey club.

Notable players

Football
 Johnny Buckley
 Maurice Fitzgerald
 Paul Galvin
 Moss Keane
 Billy Morgan
 Séamus Moynihan
 Ken O'Halloran
 Jamie O'Sullivan

Hurling
 Pat Heffernan
 Joe Deane
 James "Cha" Fitzpatrick
 Ray Cummins
 Nicky English
 Tommy Walsh
 John Grainger
 William Egan

Honours

References

External links
 UCC hurling official site
 UCC football official site

 
Gaelic games clubs in County Cork
Gaelic football clubs in County Cork
Hurling clubs in County Cork
Sport at University College Cork
Cork